Commandos 2: Men of Courage is a real-time tactics video game, developed by Pyro Studios, published by Eidos Interactive, and released on September 20, 2001. It is a sequel to Commandos: Behind Enemy Lines and the second installment of the Commandos series, and is the only strategy game of the series to be designed not only for Microsoft Windows, but also for PlayStation 2 and Xbox. The game sees players taking control of a squad of commandos, along with various allied units, as they sneak behind enemy lines to accomplish various missions in World War II, between 1941 and 1944, that will help them to thwart the war efforts of the Germans and the Japanese. The game features several improvements to the gameplay from its predecessor, including the ability to use enemy weapons and explore interior locations, the inclusion of three new commandos, a number of new skills for the original six members along with their other abilities, and new pieces of equipment to help overcome the enemy.

While the PC version of the game was well received, the console versions received less favourable reviews. In 2005, the game was bundled together with Commandos 3: Destination Berlin as part of the Commandos Battle Pack by Feral Interactive.

A remastered version of the game, Commandos 2 - HD Remaster, featuring updated graphics and controls, developed by Torus Games and published by Kalypso Media was released in 2020: for Microsoft Windows on 24 January, PlayStation 4 and Xbox One on 18 September, and for the Nintendo Switch on 4 December, and is set to be released for iPad and Android at a later date.

Gameplay
Much like its predecessor, Commandos 2 sees the player taking on the role of an allied officer in charge of directing a group of commandos, each with a different set of skills and abilities that they can use, who take part in a series of twenty-two missions - two training stages to get used to controlling the commandos; ten story missions; and ten bonus missions that feature unique challenges and situations to complete, but are only accessible after each story mission is completed, if the player acquires a set of books marked "BONUS" within each of them. Each mission in the game features a series of objectives, divided between main and secondary, that the player needs to complete in order to finish a mission, including securing an escape route from an area, as well as clues to where players can find supplies or locate useful assets to help them with their mission; while briefings for each mission outline most objectives and clues, others are provided through completing current objectives or clues the player has knowledge of (i.e. If an objective is to contact someone and the player completes this, the contact might provide an additional objective and/or clue for the player to use).

Much like Behind Enemy Lines, each mission features the player having control of a subset of commandos, though in some missions, the player begins with a few commandos to use, but can gain control of others through either contacting them somewhere in the mission's location, or rescuing them from imprisonment. The original six from the previous game are once more available for use, though some have a few notable improvements in how they can be used - the Green Beret can now climb telephone poles and traverse their cables, can jump out of windows, and can carry small containers around; the Sniper can climb up telephone poles to use them as sniping positions; the Spy can now not only direct soldiers and lieutenants to look somewhere else, but can order soldiers and enemy staff to move somewhere else if disguised as an officer, while his syringe can now daze, knock out, or kill an enemy, depending on the number of doses they are given; the Diver now kills enemies by throwing knives at them, and now carries a grappling hook that can be used to traverse walls or set up a trip-wire to knock out enemies; the Driver can now set up traps, both lethal and non-lethal; and the Sapper can now use a mine detector to find buried mines and dis-arm them, as well as set-up mines to eliminate infantry and armoured vehicles. Along with these six, the players also gets control over three new members to use, including: the Thief, who is the most agile of the group, can climb in and out of windows and through small holes, hide in tight spaces, climb and traverse telephone poles and cables like the Green Beret, and unlock metal containers and some doors with his lockpicks; the Seductress, who acts like both the Spy and the Sniper, in that when disguised she can use her lipstick to distract enemy soldiers, but can't fool officers, and when not disguised, she can use a sniper rifle to take out enemies; and Whiskey, a dog who the commandos can use to trade items between them, as well as bark near enemies to distract them. In addition to the commandos, players also gain control of allied units, most of whom can be equipped with weapons and placed in four different combat stances, including firing out of windows and crouching down, and thus be used to combat enemies when needed.

Other new features include the player being able to explore interior locations and underwater locations, facing additional threats such as wild animals and Gestapo soldiers, the ability to salvage enemy weapons from their bodies to use when needed, such as rifles and sub-machine guns, the ability to use multiple cameras to survey a mission's location, the ability to hide bodies in bodies of water or amongst certain objects such as reeds, and the inclusion of new equipment - binoculars, flamethrowers, molotov cocktails, smoke grenades, rope ladders, gas grenades, canned food and first aid kits. While the various gameplay mechanics from Behind Enemy Lines are still used, such as line of sight, the ability to view enemy positions, and other enemy behaviours, such as investigating suspicious sounds or reacting to alarms, a number of areas received notable changes - All commandos can wear enemy soldier uniforms, though unlike the Spy, the effect last only for a limited time and as long as they stay out of close range of enemies; cars and lorries can be driven by all commandos, but armoured cars require the Driver, and Tanks need both him and the Sapper; the inventory system is a grid-like space, with objects taking up a certain number of spaces depending on their size; enemies now display a line of sight when detecting something in their view, which is orange for something that has caught their interest, blue if they spotted something suspicious, and red if they have seen a commando; and commandos will be shot on sight if they are discovered by the enemy, rather than captured, while alarms last for a while before they eventually end, although guards will investigate the area that triggered it.

Plot
In May 1941, commandos Paul Toledo and Natasha Nikochevski capture an Enigma machine and its codebook in a German submarine base at La Pallice in La Rochelle, France. While Natasha leaves the base, Toledo is ordered to stay behind with the Enigma to assist the other commandos (Jack O'Hara, Thomas Hancock, James Blackwood & René Duchamp) when they arrive at daybreak to rescue the crew of a Royal Navy submarine, the E-423, sheltered and under heavy guard in a submarine pen. They destroy the base's anti-aircraft guns and torpedo warehouse before escaping in the submarine.

While in the North Sea, the Royal Navy submarine is caught and forced to surface in the frigid waters after being depth charged by a German destroyer. The enigma machine is confiscated and the entire crew captured with the exception of Blackwood and Hancock, both of whom evaded capture. After rescuing the crew, the commandos proceed to recover the Enigma and disable the destroyer's main guns and boiler room. Under orders that the Enigma be hastily brought to England, O'Hara and Duchamp takeoff in a Fieseler Fi 156, while the rest escape in the submarine.

A year passes and the commandos are deployed to the Pacific Theatre. In Burma, they rescue a spiritual leader and assassinate a Japanese tyrant with the help of Gurkhas. On 17 June 1942, the commandos are sent to northern Thailand, where they rescue a Colonel Guinness, who in turn helps them destroy the bridge over the River Kwai by revealing its structural weakness. The bridge is blown up just as a train of the Imperial Japanese Army high command crosses it, plummeting into the river.

In July 1942, the commandos land on the strongly fortified Savo Island to disable the large artillery guns, before Operation Watchtower can commence. While on the island, they are assisted by a castaway named Wilson. After destroying the artillery and rescuing a downed American pilot, he returns the favour by piloting a Kawanishi H8K to help them escape the island, but not before telling them of a gold monkey statue which is symbolic to the Japanese. O'Hara steals it as a souvenir.

In Spring of 1944, the commandos are sent to Haiphong, Indochina, destroying the port's fuel depots and infiltrating the Japanese aircraft carrier Shinano. While out at sea, the commandos sabotage the rudder of every A6M Zero and report the carrier's position before escaping in two intact Zeroes. The Shinano is then bombed by American Vought F4U Corsairs.

Following their tour of duty in the Pacific, the commandos are recalled to the Western Front for the Normandy invasion. During the battle of Cherbourg, they rescue a wounded Private Smith, and with the help of American soldiers, successfully defend the town from waves of German infantry and Panzer III tanks. A few months later, Toledo is captured and taken to Colditz Castle where he is to be executed. The commandos save him and they help the prisoners of war housed there escape by disguising them in German uniform. While the prisoners escape, the commandos acquire top secret documents from three high-ranking German officers, revealing plans to devastate Paris with planted explosives before it is liberated.

In August 1944, the entire commando corps arrive in Paris and thwart plans to destroy much of the city, before leaving in an airship from the top of the Eiffel Tower.

Development
Commandos 2 was developed on a budget of roughly $7 million.

Reception

Sales
According to Eidos Interactive chairman Ian Livingstone, "[m]ore than 500,000 units of Commandos 2: Men of Courage were shipped on launch and the title entered the retail charts in the top five in all of our major markets". However, he reported that it sold below expectations and contributed to the company's £11 million loss in the quarter. The game ultimately surpassed 500,000 units sold by September 2002. The game's computer version received a "Silver" sales award from the Entertainment and Leisure Software Publishers Association (ELSPA), indicating sales of at least 100,000 copies in the United Kingdom; a "Gold" certification from the Verband der Unterhaltungssoftware Deutschland (VUD), for sales of at least 100,000 units across Germany, Austria and Switzerland; and a "Platinum" prize in Spain, for over 80,000 sales in the country during its first year. Its PlayStation 2 version sold 40,000 units in the region.

Critical reviews
The PC version received "generally favorable reviews", while the PlayStation 2 and Xbox versions received "average" reviews, according to the review aggregation website Metacritic. With an aggregate score of 87, the computer version of Commandos 2 is the highest-rated Spanish game listed on Metacritic. The PC version was praised for the AI which was advanced for the time but criticized for the steep learning curve. Many reviewers found that the controls of the console versions were much less intuitive and easy to use than the PC controls and that they made the game more difficult as a result. Most reviewers recommended the PC version instead.

Carla Harker reviewed the PC version of the game for Next Generation, rating it three stars out of five, and stated that "Commandos 2 is insanely difficult. Non-masochists need not apply".

GameLive PC named Commandos 2 the best strategy game of 2001–2002. The editors of Computer Games Magazine nominated Commandos 2 as the best real-time strategy game of 2001, but ultimately gave the award to Kohan: Immortal Sovereigns. It was likewise a runner-up for The Electric Playgrounds "Best Strategy Game for PC" prize, which went to Etherlords.

Legacy
In 2021, GQ España named Commandos 2 one of the best Spanish-made games ever.

HD Remaster
After owning the rights to the series when the original company Pyro Studios went defunct in 2017, Kalypso Media released an HD Remaster of Commandos 2 in 2020. It received mixed reviews due to poor controls, underwhelming up-res and heavy censorship; any Nazi symbolism has been removed from the game.

References

External links
Commandos 2 fan site
 
 

2001 video games
Cancelled Dreamcast games
Cooperative video games
Pyro Studios games
MacOS games
PlayStation 2 games
Real-time tactics video games
Video games developed in Spain
Video game sequels
Video games set in France
Video games set in Germany
Video games set in Myanmar
Video games set in Paris
Video games set in the Solomon Islands
Video games set in Thailand
Video games set in Vietnam
Windows games
World War II video games
Xbox games
Feral Interactive games
Pacific War video games
PlayStation 4 games
Xbox One games
Nintendo Switch games
Multiplayer and single-player video games